, sometimes shortened to , is a traditional wax-resist textile dyeing technique in Japan, akin to Indonesian batik.

References 
 Review of The World of Rozome: Wax-Resist Textiles of Japan by Betsy Sterling Benjamin

See also
 
 
 
 

Japanese dyeing techniques
Japanese art terminology
Batik